Brian Ernest Arthur Edmeades (born 17 September 1941) is a former English cricketer who enjoyed a successful county cricket career with Essex between 1961 and 1976. Edmeades was an all rounder who went on to score over 15,000 runs, including 15 centuries, and took 500 wickets for his county.

Career
A right-hand bat and right-arm medium bowler born in Matlock, Derbyshire, in 1941, Edmeades began playing for the Essex Second XI in 1958, impressing enough to be awarded a First XI appearance in 1961 and his full cap in 1965. He took 100 wickets in a season in 1966, and he scored over 1000 runs in a season on five occasions: 1967, 1969, 1970, 1972 and 1975. The last occasion was also his benefit year with Essex, which raised £12,000.

Notes

External links
 
 

1941 births
Living people
People from Matlock, Derbyshire
Cricketers from Derbyshire
English cricketers
Essex cricketers